Sir John Prichard-Jones, 1st Baronet (31 May 1841 – 17 October 1917) was a self-made Welsh business man of the Victorian and Edwardian era. His main business was the London West End department store Dickins & Jones.

For most of his life, his name was John Jones. In 1917, a few years after being created a baronet, and a few months before his death, he changed his surname by deed poll to Prichard-Jones.

Life
Born to a Welsh-speaking family at Tyn-Coed, a small farm near Newborough, Anglesey. His parents were Richard Jones, farmer, and Jane Jones, formerly Owen. He was aged one month on the 1841 census when he is recorded with father and mother Richard and Jane, aged 35 and 30, and siblings Elinor, Richard, William and Owen, aged 15, 9, 6 and 4. At the age of fourteen Jones was apprenticed to a draper in Caernarfon and afterwards moved to Pwllheli, then to Bangor and eventually, when he was nineteen, to London. In 1872 he entered the firm of Dickins, Smith & Stevens in Regent Street. There he was successively promoted to buyer, manager, director, chairman of the board and finally to partner, when the name of the store was changed to Dickins & Jones.

He was also involved in the management of other businesses and was prominent in movements for the promotion of workers' welfare, as well as supporting profit-sharing schemes for his employees. He was Treasurer of the Welsh National Museum and a member of the Council of the North Wales University College at Bangor, of which he was a generous benefactor, becoming Vice-President of the College Council in 1909. The University of Wales awarded him an honorary doctorate.

Jones maintained lifelong links with his native county, where he had a home, Bron Menai, Dwyran. He was made High Sheriff of Anglesey for 1905, and in 1910 a Deputy Lieutenant of Anglesey and a Baronet, for his services to education and the community.

As well as his house in Wales, Jones had a country house at Elstree, in Hertfordshire called Maes yr Hâv.

In 1911 he married secondly Marie, the younger daughter of Charles Read, and with her had two sons. He died at his London home in 1917, the result of an accident. He was succeeded in the baronetcy by his elder son, also called John Prichard-Jones, then aged four.

The Prichard Jones Institute 
The Prichard Jones Institute, opened in 1905 at Newborough, Anglesey, may be described as a community centre for the people of Newborough. It consisted of a library, facilities for exhibitions, meetings and lectures. Also on the site were cottages which were made available to local elderly people, subject to certain criteria, who would also be paid a pension from a fund established by Sir John Prichard-Jones. The fund was financed through monies gained from a property in London, but unfortunately the property was destroyed through bombing during World War II. Without this fund the building had fallen into disrepair and required renovation.

The Institute is a registered charity.

In 2006 the Pritchard Jones Institute was one of the buildings nominated for the BBC television show Restoration.

References

1845 births
1917 deaths
People from Anglesey
British businesspeople
House of Fraser
Baronets in the Baronetage of the United Kingdom
High Sheriffs of Anglesey
Deputy Lieutenants of Anglesey
People from Elstree
19th-century British businesspeople